Jack Carroll (1921–1998) is an Irish hurler who played as a goalkeeper for the Offaly senior hurling team.

Carroll made his first appearance for the team during the 1943 championship and was a regular member of the starting fifteen until his retirement after the 1953 championship. During that time he enjoyed little success as Offaly were regarded as one of the minnows of provincial hurling.

At club level Carroll was a five-time county club championship medalist with Coolderry.

Carroll's father-in-law, "Red" Jack Teehan, his son, Pat Carroll, and his grandson, Brian Carroll, also played hurling with Offaly.

References

1921 births
1998 deaths
Hurling goalkeepers
Coolderry hurlers
Offaly inter-county hurlers
Leinster inter-provincial hurlers